Stacy Lewis (born February 16, 1985) is an American professional golfer on the U.S.-based LPGA Tour. She has won two major championships: the Kraft Nabisco Championship in 2011 and the Women's British Open in 2013. She was ranked number one in the Women's World Golf Rankings for four weeks in 2013, and reclaimed the position in June 2014 with a victory at the ShopRite LPGA Classic for another 21 weeks.

Early life
Lewis was born on February 16, 1985, in Toledo, Ohio. She grew up in Texas at The Woodlands outside of Houston, and graduated from The Woodlands High School in 2003. Suffering from scoliosis, which was diagnosed at age 11 and treated by a spinal fusion when she was in high school, she missed her first collegiate golf season recovering from the surgery.

Amateur career
Lewis was a decorated amateur and a four-time All-American at the University of Arkansas. She redshirted her first year while recovering from her back surgery. As a redshirt freshman in 2005, she won the Southeastern Conference Tournament and was named SEC Freshman Golfer of the Year.  In 2006, she won the Women's Western Amateur.

In her 2007 season, though a back injury kept Lewis out of the SEC Tournament, she won the NCAA Division I Championship and was selected Golf Digest Amateur of the Year.  She also received the National Golf Coaches Association Dinah Shore Trophy.  Following the college season, she won the 92nd Women's Southern Amateur and finished second in individual play in leading the U.S. team to a victory at the Copa de las Americas.

Lewis qualified for the 2007 U.S. Women's Open in North Carolina, shot 78-73 in the tournament and missed the cut by three strokes to finish tied for 93rd. Two months later, Lewis finished first in the 2007 LPGA NW Arkansas Championship, a professional LPGA tournament. Due to rain, the tournament was shortened to one round and Lewis's win was declared unofficial.

In her senior season in 2008, Lewis again won the SEC Tournament and was selected SEC Golfer of the Year and SEC Golf Scholar Athlete of the Year.  She was named to the ESPN the Magazine Academic All-America team for the second time and NGCA All-America for the fourth time. She graduated from Arkansas in 2008 with a bachelor's degree in Finance and Accounting.
  
As a member of U.S. Curtis Cup team in 2008, Lewis became the first player ever to go 5–0 in a single Curtis Cup. The 2008 edition was held at the Old Course at St Andrews in Scotland in late May and early June, and was her last competition as an amateur. The U.S. won 13 to 7 for a sixth consecutive victory over Great Britain & Ireland.

Professional career
Following the Curtis Cup victory, Lewis turned professional, prior to competing in sectional qualifying for the U.S. Women's Open. She won medalist honors in the Garland, Texas, sectional on June 9 to qualify for her first tournament as a professional. She was tied for ninth after 36 holes and shot a 67 (−6) in the third round to lead the field, but a final round 78 (+5) left her tied for third, five strokes behind winner Inbee Park. Lewis competed in seven events on the LPGA tour in 2008, with two top-10 finishes and earned over $247,000.

Before 2009, Lewis was not a member of the LPGA Tour or any other professional golf tour. She was eligible to play in the U.S. Women's Open after successfully competing in the sanctioned qualifying process.  She then tried to earn her LPGA Tour card in 2008 through the use of sponsor's exemptions, but was not successful.

As a result, Lewis went to sectional qualifying in September in California and advanced to the final stage of the LPGA Qualifying Tournament in Florida in December, an event which garnered considerably more press coverage than normal, due to the presence of Michelle Wie. Lewis finished as the medalist for the five-round event, three shots ahead of the field and six in front of Wie, who finished in a tie for 7th place.

Lewis's first official professional victory came at the 2011 Kraft Nabisco Championship, a major, where she led the field for the first two rounds, and then held off current world number 1 and defending champion Yani Tseng to win by three strokes. She made her Solheim Cup debut in 2011, qualifying second for the U.S. team behind Cristie Kerr.

Lewis's endorsement deals include Mizuno Corp. golf clubs and Fila Golf apparel. She signed a sponsorship deal with KPMG in 2012.

In 2012, Lewis won four tournaments, and became the first American player to win the LPGA Player of the Year award since Beth Daniel in 1994. Lewis won three times in 2013, and after her win at the RR Donnelley LPGA Founders Cup in Arizona on March 17, Lewis unseated Yani Tseng as the #1 ranked woman golfer in the world. Inbee Park overtook the number one position four weeks later on April 15. Lewis won her second major title at Women's British Open in August at St Andrews with a score of 280 (−8), two strokes ahead of runners-up Na Yeon Choi and Hee Young Park.

In 2014, Lewis won the North Texas LPGA Shootout on May 4 for her ninth official victory on tour, six strokes ahead of runner-up Meena Lee. Four weeks later, she won the ShopRite LPGA Classic and reclaimed the top position in the world rankings. A week after a runner-up finish at the U.S. Women's Open at Pinehurst, Lewis won the Walmart NW Arkansas Championship on June 29. Lewis would go on to win her second LPGA Player of the Year award in a three-year span. She would also win her second consecutive Vare Trophy for the season's lowest scoring average.

In April 2015, Lewis lost in a sudden death playoff to Brittany Lincicome at the ANA Inspiration. Lincicome won with a par on the third extra hole, having forced the playoff with Lewis after an eagle at the 72nd hole of regulation play.

As of June 2015, Lewis was represented by Sterling Sports Management. Lewis was the top female earner on the 2015 Golf Digest 50 All-Encompassing Money List, ranking at number 41.

On September 3, 2017, Lewis won the Cambia Portland Classic for her first victory in three years. Prior to the tournament, Lewis pledged her earnings to relief for victims of Hurricane Harvey. With her winner's check, and a matching donation from her main sponsor, KPMG, this amounted to $390,000.

Lewis missed the final women's major of the year – the Evian Championship – and later said she would not play in the event again until big changes had been made to the event. "It’s not treated like a major, and yet we are calling it that," she said.

In 2020, Lewis won her first title in almost three years with a playoff victory in the Aberdeen Standard Investments Ladies Scottish Open at The Renaissance Club in East Lothian, Scotland.

Lewis will captain the U.S. Solheim Cup team in 2023 and 2024.

Professional wins (14)

LPGA Tour wins (13*)

* Unofficial LPGA Tour win due to tournament being shortened to one round
Lewis competed in the 2007 LPGA NW Arkansas Championship as an amateur.
Co-sanctioned by the LPGA of Japan Tour

LPGA Tour playoff record (1–3)

Major championships

Wins (2)

Results timeline
Results not in chronological order before 2022.

^ The Evian Championship was added as a major in 2013

LA = Low amateur
CUT = missed the half-way cut
NT = no tournament
"T" = tied

Summary

Most consecutive cuts made – 37 (2010 Kraft Nabisco – 2018 ANA)
Longest streak of top-10s – 4 (2013 British Open – 2014 U.S. Open)

LPGA Tour career summary

^ Official as of 2022 season
* Includes matchplay and other events with no cut.
1 Lewis turned professional in June 2008, but was not a member of the LPGA Tour until 2009.

World ranking
Position in Women's World Golf Rankings at the end of each calendar year.

Team appearances
Amateur
Curtis Cup (representing the United States): 2008 (winners)

Professional
Solheim Cup (representing the United States): 2011, 2013, 2015 (winners), 2017 (winners)
International Crown (representing the United States): 2014, 2016 (winners)

Solheim Cup record

See also
List of golfers with most LPGA major championship wins
List of golfers with most LPGA Tour wins

References

External links

 

American female golfers
Arkansas Razorbacks women's golfers
LPGA Tour golfers
Winners of LPGA major golf championships
Solheim Cup competitors for the United States
Olympic golfers of the United States
Golfers at the 2016 Summer Olympics
Golfers from Ohio
Golfers from Houston
Golfers from Florida
Sportspeople from Toledo, Ohio
People from Palm Beach Gardens, Florida
1985 births
Living people